Banderas, the Tyrant is a 1993 internationally co-produced film directed by José Luis García Sánchez. It is an adaptation of the 1926 novel Tirano Banderas by Ramón María del Valle-Inclán. It was produced by companies from Spain, Cuba and Mexico. It stars  Gian Maria Volonté as the title character, also featuring Ana Belén, Juan Diego, Fernando Guillén, Ignacio López Tarso and Javier Gurruchaga.

Plot 
An adaptation of the (often presented as "unadaptable") novel Tirano Banderas, a standout work of the esperpento genre which underpins a criticism of abuses of power, the plot tracks the developments in the fictitious republic of Santa Fe de Tierra Firme, ruled by megalomaniac dictator Santos Banderas. The dictator has been noted to display an amalgamation of features from real dictators such as Rafael Leónidas Trujillo, Miguel Primo de Rivera or Juan Vicente Gómez.

Cast

Production 
Featuring an ambitious budget of 450 million ₧, the film was produced by Ion Films S. A. with the collaboration of Iberoamericana Films Producción S. A., Atrium Productions S. A., Promociones Audiovisuales Reunidas S. A., Antena 3 Televisión, ICAIC and Cinematográfica del Prado.

It was shot in 1993 in Mexico and Cuba (Havana and Trinidad).

Release 
The 50th Venice International Film Festival ruled out the film for its official competition. It screened as the only Spanish film in competition at the Valladolid International Film Festival (Seminci) in October 1993, where it met polarizing opinions. The film had a limited theatrical release in Galicia before the end of the year just so it could become eligible for the 8th Goya Awards, where it won the award for Best Adapted Screenplay and 5 additional awards in technical categories. It had a wide theatrical release in Spain on 14 January 1994.

Awards and nominations 

|-
| align = "center" | 1993 || 38th Valladolid Film Festival || Best Actor || Gian Maria Volonté ||  || 
|-
| align = "center" rowspan = "7" | 1994 || rowspan = "7" | 8th Goya Awards || Best Adapted Screenplay || José Luis García Sánchez, Rafael Azcona ||  || rowspan = "7" | 
|-
| Best Supporting Actor || Javier Gurruchaga || 
|-
| Best Editing || Pablo del Amo || 
|-
| Best Art Direction || Félix Murcia || 
|-
| Best Production Supervision || José Luis García Arrojo || 
|-
| Best Costume Design || Andrea D'Odorico || 
|-
| Best Makeup and Hairstyles || Magdalena Álvarez, Solange Aumaitre || 
|}

See also 
 List of Spanish films of 1994

References 
Citations

Bibliography
 

1993 films
1990s Spanish-language films
Films shot in Mexico
Films shot in Cuba
Films about dictators
Films based on Spanish novels
Spanish drama films
Cuban drama films
Mexican drama films
1990s Mexican films